Sinatruces (also spelled Sinatrukes or Sanatruces) was king of the Parthian Empire from  to . He was presumably a son of the Parthian ruler Mithridates I. Sinatruces was succeeded by his son Phraates III.

Reign 
The Parthian Empire had since the death of Mithridates II fallen into a state of turmoil and decline; the authority of the crown had decreased, while the empire lost lands to its neighbours. The name of the Arsacid branch established by Sinatruces on the Parthian throne has been coined by the modern historian Marek Jan Olbrycht as the "Sinatrucids", which ruled the Parthian Empire till 12 AD. The Sinatrucid family was notably supported by the Suren clan of Sakastan.

During Sinatruces' reign, the Artaxiad king of Armenia, Tigranes the Great, took advantage of the weakness of the Parthians, and retook the "seventy valleys" he had previously ceded to Mithridates II, and also went to conquer the Parthian domains of Media Atropatene, Gordyene, Adiabene, Osroene, and northern Mesopotamia. Sinatruces died in 69 BC and was succeeded by his son Phraates III. The modern historian Saghi Gazerani has come up with the hypothesis that the story of the legendary Iranian monarch Zav Tahmasp includes echoes of the life of Sinatruces.

Coinage 
On the observe of his coins, Sinatruces is portrayed with a tiara decorated with a line of stags. The stags are a reference to the religious symbolism of the Saka, who had helped him ascend the throne. Sinatruces' son Phraates III also made use of stag symbols on his coins.

Notes

References

Sources 

 
 
 
  
 
 
 
 
 
 
 
  
  
 
 
 
 

150s BC births
69 BC deaths
1st-century BC Parthian monarchs
Parthian Dark Age